KTMT-FM (93.7 MHz, "Joy! 93.7") is a commercial Christian contemporary music radio station in Medford, Oregon, United States, broadcasting to the Medford-Ashland, Oregon area. The station is currently owned by Stephens Media Group.

History
KTMT-FM in the 1970s had a beautiful music format. Beginning in the 1980s, the station had a Top 40/CHR format known as "Stereo 93", later known as “Power 93 KTMT” and then later “Beat 93” in the 1990s until 2005.

On April 1, 2005, KTMT-FM dropped its longtime Top 40 format to jump on the adult hits bandwagon as "93.7 Mike FM".

In early 2009, the station changed to Adult Top 40 as “Mix 93” and had a contest in which listeners competed to design the station’s new logo.

On March 25, 2011, KTMT began stunting with a series of heartbeats, then the station returned on March 29, 2011 to its former Top 40 format as "Beat 93.7".

On March 31, 2012, KTMT-FM rebranded as "Now 93.7".

On July 14, 2021, at 12 noon, 5 days after launching "Hits 93.3" on translator K227AA and KTMT-HD2, KTMT-FM rebranded as "Joy! 93.7" with a Christian contemporary music format.

KTMT-HD2
On July 9, 2021, KTMT-FM launched a top 40/CHR format on its HD2 subchannel, branded as "Hits 93.3" (simulcast on translator K227AA 93.3 FM Ashland).

Translators
KTMT-FM broadcasts on the following translators:

Previous logo
 (KTMT-FM's logo under previous "Mix 93" format)

References

External links
Joy! 93.7

TMT-FM
TMT-FM
Radio stations established in 1970
1970 establishments in Oregon
Contemporary Christian music